THPP may refer to:
 Thiamine pyrophosphate
Tripura Hill People's Party, Indian political party